Thalysia (Θαλύσια) was an ancient Greek festival of first fruits held in the honor of Demeter, the earth goddess.

References
Illiad,book1
Festivals in ancient Greece